Robin Das is a former football player from Howrah, India.

Early life
He was born on 15 January 1954 at Howrah, West Bengal. He was a student of Santragachi Kedarnath Institution and Akshay Shikshayatan. He played in the Subroto Cup numerous times for his school. Afterwards, he got a job with the Eastern Railways and played for the team. He played the Santosh Trophy many times for the club. Afterwards, he was appointed the chief cashier of a nationalized bank. He left footballing in 1982 due to hard work.

Sports life
Rabin joined Sporting Union that was playing first division in Calcutta. He started training under Pradeep Banerjee. He played an exhibition match in Kabul against Pakistan for the Senior Indian Football team and scored a goal against Pakistan. In club football, Rabin's first contract was with East Bengal in the mid 1970s. Next he played for the Mohammedan S.C. Afterwards he signed to Mohun Bagan. Up to 1982, he played for Mohun Bagan club.

References

1954 births
Indian footballers
Living people
Association football defenders
People from Howrah
Footballers from West Bengal
East Bengal Club players
Mohammedan SC (Kolkata) players
Mohun Bagan AC players